National Park are a Scottish band formed in 1997 in Glasgow. The band's music has been described as having some similarities to Velvet Underground, Galaxie 500 and Yo La Tengo "without sounding like anything else.""

History 
The band was formed by former Telstar Ponies member John Hogarty and Scott Walker. In August 1997, the band played their first gig. Simon Shaw and Michael McGaughrin of the band V-Twin joined Hogarty and Walker, and played the bass and drums, respectively.

National Park's first single, "Great Western", was a 10" released on Earworm records; a ten-minute-long improvisation. It was recorded on a tape deck at an early rehearsal session. Despite the length of the track it was playlisted on Xfm London. Hogarty was also part of the Phantom Engineer project with David Keenan and Bill Wells. Collaborations with Future Pilot A.K.A. then followed, and were released on Beggars Banquet Records and also on Earworm records. The band also played live with many of their favourite bands, including Belle and Sebastian at the Shepherd's Bush Empire.

Scott Walker left the band in 1999, and was replaced briefly by Alasdair Roberts (of Appendix Out) and later by Gerard Love of Teenage Fanclub.  Walker did return briefly to record "No More Rides" for the compilation You Don't Need Darkness to Do What You Think is Right, which was released by Geographic Music, a subsidiary of Domino Recording Company during 2001-2002.

In 2003, the band released a lathe-cut 7" single, "Background Frequencies", on an Australian label. In 2005 National Park released "The Only Stars" in Japan, which featured contributions by Bill Wells (piano), Sarah Martin (flute) and Mick Cooke (horn) of Belle and Sebastian.

Discography

Singles
"Great Western" (1998) 10" on Earworm
"Norman Dolph's Money" (1999) 7" collaboration with Future Pilot AKA on Earworm
"Secret Songs" (2003) 7" on Background Frequencies
"The Only Stars" (2005) 7" on Yield

Compilation appearances
"Sterling", on Future Pilot A.K.A. vs. A Galaxy of Sound (2000)
"No More Rides" on You Don't Need Darkness to Do What You Think Is Right (2002) Geographic
"The Only Stars", on Crunk Into Up Vol. 3 (2005)

References

External links
Official website
National Park at Earworm
National Park at Yield

Musical groups established in 1997
Musical groups from Glasgow